Patania deficiens is a moth of the family Crambidae described by Frederic Moore in 1887. It is found in India, Indonesia, Japan, Korea, Russia and Taiwan.

References

External links
Images. Barcode of Life Data System

Moths described in 1887
Moths of Japan
Moths of Korea
Moths of Asia
Moths of Taiwan
Spilomelinae
Taxa named by Frederic Moore